is a Japanese manga series written and illustrated by Takahiro Katō. It was serialized on Shogakukan's Sunday Webry manga website from July 2016 to June 2019, with its chapters collected in thirteen tankōbon volumes.

Publication
Jinmen is written and illustrated by Takahiro Katō. The manga was serialized on Shogakukan's Sunday Webry manga website from July 13, 2016, to June 24, 2019. Shogakukan collected its chapters in thirteen tankōbon volumes, released from January 12, 2017, to September 12, 2019.

Volume list

Reception
In 2018, the manga was nominated for the 64th Shogakukan Manga Awards in the shōnen category.

References

External links
 

2010s webcomics
2016 webcomic debuts
2019 webcomic endings
Horror anime and manga
Shogakukan manga
Shōnen manga
Fiction about zoos